Maxwell Cummings,  (April 19, 1898 – May 23, 2001) was a Canadian real estate builder and philanthropist.

Born in Saint John, New Brunswick, the son of David and Beatrice Cummings, he came to Montreal with his family in 1911. His siblings included Harold Cummings, Nathan Cummings, and Minnie Abbey (née Cummings)

In 1929, he began a career in real estate brokerage and development. He was responsible for Canada's first strip mall, the Norgate shopping centre in Saint-Laurent (now part of Montreal) and was one of the first Canadians to develop low-cost housing.

He was a prominent member of the Montreal Jewish community.  His offspring include the late philanthropist and entrepreneur Jack Cummings and businessman Robert Cummings. Jack's children include Steven Cummings, who like his grandfather has received the Order of Canada, Richard Cummings, former Executive Director of Jewish Family and Child Toronto, and Nancy Cummings-Gold, former president of The PACCK Foundation and wife of Senator Marc Gold.

In 1978, Maxwell Cummings was made a Member of the Order of Canada and a Grand officer of the National Order of Quebec in 1990.

References
 

1898 births
2001 deaths
Anglophone Quebec people
Businesspeople from Montreal
Businesspeople from Saint John, New Brunswick
Canadian centenarians
Men centenarians
Jewish Canadian philanthropists
Canadian philanthropists
Grand Officers of the National Order of Quebec
Members of the Order of Canada